Te Whakataupuka  (late 1700s – by December 1835) was a notable New Zealand Ngāi Tahu leader. He was born in Murihiku, Southland, New Zealand and active from about 1826.

References

Year of birth unknown
1835 deaths
Ngāi Tahu people
People from Southland, New Zealand